Daleys Point is a south-eastern suburb of the Central Coast region of New South Wales, Australia on the Bouddi Peninsula. It is part of the  local government area. The median house price in January 2010 was A$950,000.

Population
In the 2016 Census, there were 681 people in Daleys Point. 74.0% of people were born in Australia and 87.8% of people spoke only English at home. The most common responses for religion were Catholic 30.0%, Anglican 23.4% and No Religion 22.6%.

History 
Daleys Point was the site of a shipyard operated by the Beattie family, during the first half of the 20th century.

References

Suburbs of the Central Coast (New South Wales)